Wodzisław  is a town in Jędrzejów County, Świętokrzyskie Voivodeship, in south-central Poland. It is the seat of the gmina (administrative district) called Gmina Wodzisław.
Between the 16th and 19th centuries, Wodzisław was a property of the Lanckorońscy family. The town has a population of 1,100.

Wodzisław has a long and rich history, which dates back to the reign of King Wladyslaw Lokietek, who granted it town rights in ca. 1317. At that time, it was called Wlodzislaw, and the town was a royal property. In 1370, King Kazimierz Wielki handed the town over to a local nobleman Zbigniew Przedbor. In the 16th century, Wodzisław became property of the Lanckoronski family, and was a local center of artisans. In 1551, the wooden Roman Catholic church was transferred to the Calvinists, and most residents switched to Calvinism. Wodzisław was one of main centers of Protestant Reformation in Lesser Poland, here as many as 20 Calvinist synods took place (1557, 1558, 1559, twice in 1560, 1561, 1566, 1583, 1589, 1590, 1595, twice in 1597, 1599, 1601, 1604, 1606, 1607, 1609, 1610, 1611, and 1612). Calvinist prayer house at Wodzisław was closed down in 1613, after the Zebrzydowski Rebellion, when town’s owner Samuel Lanckoronski abandoned Calvinism and became a Roman Catholic. Soon afterwards, Lanckoronski built St. Martin church, and ordered all Calvinists either to convert, or to leave Wodzisław. The church burned in 1746, to be rebuilt in 1787 by Maciej Lanckoronski.

The town had a castle, built in mid-16th century by Jan Lanckoromski. In the late 17th century, the castle was turned into a palace, and at the same time, first Jewish settlers came to Wodzisław, and in 1720, first synagogue was opened. Until the Partitions of Poland Wodzisław was part of Lesser Poland’s Sandomierz Voivodeship. In 1795 it was annexed by the Habsburg Empire, and in 1815 – 1915, it belonged to Russian-controlled Congress Poland. According to the 1827 census, Wodzisław had the population of 1,760, with 191 houses. By 1857, the population grew to 2,081, with 1,463 Jews. In 1865, the town burned in a fire, and in 1869 it lost its town rights.

References

Jędrzejów County
Kraków Voivodeship (14th century – 1795)
Kielce Governorate
Kielce Voivodeship (1919–1939)